Basil Saunders Beazley (1913-1943) was a male rower who competed for England.

Rowing career
Beazley represented England and won a gold medal in the eights at the 1938 British Empire Games in Sydney, New South Wales, Australia.

Personal life
He was an electrical engineer by trade and lived in Newport Road, Cardiff during 1938. He was killed during World War II, in 1943 when serving as a Major with the Royal Engineers and is buried at the Syracuse War Cemetery in Sicily.

References

1913 births
1943 deaths
English male rowers
Boxers at the 1938 British Empire Games
Commonwealth Games medallists in rowing
Commonwealth Games gold medallists for England
Royal Engineers officers
British Army personnel killed in World War II
Military personnel from Oxfordshire
Medallists at the 1938 British Empire Games